The BioFuels Security Act is a proposed legislative Act of Congress intended to phase out current single-fueled vehicles in favor of flexible-fuel vehicles. Under this proposal, contemporary single-fuel vehicles would cease production in 2016.

Only a Bill
Senator Tom Harkin (on behalf of himself, and Senators Richard Lugar, Tim Johnson, Byron Dorgan, Joe Biden and Barack Obama), introduced this bill (S. 2817/109th) on March 16, 2006. This bill is still under consideration.

Biofuels
The bill would also require major US gasoline companies to carry E-85 renewable fuel (85 percent ethanol), and for 50 percent of their gasoline stations to extend and increase the Renewable Fuel Standards (RFS). To assist in this increase in FFVs, all major gas companies would be required to have 50 percent ethanol distribution tanks equipped to all their facilities. Gasoline companies would receive tax credits for meeting the requirements of distributing and changing pumps to ethanol (an increase from a 30 percent reduction to that of a 50 percent reduction).

See also
E85 and Biodiesel Access Act (HR 6734)

References

External links
GovTrack S 2817
Richard Lugar's Senate Website 

United States proposed federal environmental legislation
Biofuels
Proposed legislation of the 109th United States Congress
Proposed legislation of the 110th United States Congress